Börje Nyberg (26 March 1920 – 2 May 2005) was a Swedish actor and film director. He appeared in more than 40 films and television shows between 1947 and 1996.

Selected filmography
 Dinner for Two (1947)
 Customs Officer Bom (1951)
 Marianne (1953)
 Dance in the Smoke (1954)
 The Jazz Boy (1958)
 I, a Lover (1966)
 Here's Your Life (1966)
 Andersson's Kalle (1972)
 Sköna juveler (1984)

References

External links

1920 births
2005 deaths
20th-century Swedish male actors
Swedish male film actors
Swedish male television actors
Swedish film directors
Male actors from Stockholm